Banksia littoralis, commonly known as the swamp banksia, swamp oak, river banksia or seaside banksia and the western swamp banksia, is a species of tree that is endemic to the south-west of Western Australia. The Noongar peoples know the plant as pungura, boongura or gwangia. It has rough, crumbly bark, linear, more or less serrated leaves arranged in whorls, yellow flowers and up to two hundred follicles in each head.

Description
There are sometimes up to two hundred follicles in each head.

Taxonomy and naming
Banksia littoralis was first formally described by Robert Brown in Transactions of the Linnean Society of London from specimens he collected from around the shores of King George Sound, "especially of Princess Royal Harbour" in December 1801.

In 1891, Otto Kuntze, in his Revisio Generum Plantarum, rejected the generic name Banksia L.f., on the grounds that the name Banksia had previously been published in 1776 as Banksia J.R.Forst & G.Forst, referring to the genus now known as Pimelea. Kuntze proposed Sirmuellera as an alternative, referring to this species as Sirmuellera littoralis. This application of the principle of priority was largely ignored by Kuntze's contemporaries, and Banksia L.f. was formally conserved and Sirmuellera rejected in 1940.

Banksia littoralis appears most closely related to the other species of the series Spicigerae such as B. seminuda and B. occidentalis and is also quite closely related to B. verticillata a smaller shrub with much thicker leaves.

Distribution and habitat
Swamp banksia to coastal areas of south western Western Australia from the Wheatbelt, Peel, South West and Great Southern regions where it is often situated on along creeks and rivers, in low-lying, seasonally damp areas like swamps and depressions where it grows well in high moisture peaty to sandy soils. It is often part of low woodland communities and often is associated with Melaleuca preissiana and also in Eucalyptus gomphocephala forest communities and is rarely found as a part of low coastal kwongan communities. The range extends from around Mount Lesueur in the north to around Cape Leeuwin in the south west extending east to around Two Peoples Bay and the Stirling Range.

Ecology

Response to fire
This banksia releases its seeds from the follicles as they mature and the plant responds to fire by resprouting from epicormic buds.

Use in horticulture
Banksia littoralis is relatively easy to grow. It is possibly not as sensitive to dieback as other western banksias. Seeds do not require any treatment, and take 20 to 36 days to germinate.

References

littoralis
Endemic flora of Western Australia
Eudicots of Western Australia
Trees of Australia
Trees of Mediterranean climate
Taxa named by Robert Brown (botanist, born 1773)
Ornamental trees
Plants described in 1810